An-Nasir ad-Din Muhammad (1411 – 1422) was the son of Sayf ad-Din Tatar, and a Mamluk sultan of Egypt from 30 November 1421 to 1 April 1422.

References

Burji sultans
15th-century Mamluk sultans
1411 births
1422 deaths